A coin catalog (or coin catalogue) is a listing of coin types. Information may include pictures of the obverse and reverse (front and back), date and place of minting, distribution type, translation of inscriptions, description of images, theme, metal type, mintage, edge description, orientation of the coin, weight, diameter, thickness, design credentials, shape and prices for various grades. Defects may be described.

The quality, detail and completeness of the information available about a particular coin varies according to popularity, commonality, and available scholarly research.

Because of the huge number of coins in world history, there are no comprehensive catalogs. Professional collectors typically keep many books for identification and assessment.

Most commonly, coin catalogs come in one of two forms. Reference works such as A Guide Book of United States Coins, published by Whitman Publishing and more popularly known as the Red Book, and the Standard Catalog of World Coins, published by Krause Publications, give descriptions and approximate prices of coins at many different levels of preservation, or grades. The other form is the auction catalog, where only those specific coins available in the auction are described, with photo plates available for some of the more prominent coins.

Coin catalogs are essential when dealing with ancient or foreign coins, where the inscriptions may be obscure and unrecognizably stylized, even for a native speaker.

Coin catalogs today are supplemented by Internet sites, some of which have the advantage of being attached to user forums, so that issues such as counterfeiting may be discussed. These sites also provide tools connected to catalogs for tracking collections. With the rise of online auctions, it is now possible for collectors to research their coins at commercial sites as well as myriad collector-created sites containing research into diverse collecting specialties.

Public and private institutions that hold significant collections of coins (and other money-objects) also produce catalogs - these integrate scholarly research of different disciplines - see, for example, the British Museum Catalogues of Coins.

See also

 Coin collecting
 Coin grading
 Standard Catalog of World Coins
 Standard Catalogue of British Coins

References

Coin grading